Terebratulidae is a family of brachiopods with a fossil record dating back to the Late Devonian. It is subdivided into 11 subfamilies.

References

Further reading 
 Fossils (Smithsonian Handbooks) by David Ward (Page 93)
 

Terebratulida
Brachiopod families
Prehistoric protostome families
Devonian brachiopods
Carboniferous brachiopods
Permian brachiopods
Mesozoic brachiopods
Cenozoic brachiopods
Brachiopods of Africa
Brachiopods of Asia
Brachiopods of Europe
Brachiopods of North America
Brachiopods of Oceania
Brachiopods of South America
Paleozoic brachiopods of Africa
Paleozoic brachiopods of North America
Paleozoic brachiopods of Oceania
Paleozoic brachiopods of South America
Extinct animals of Antarctica
Extant Late Devonian first appearances